Shamilkala is an urban locality (an urban-type settlement) in Untsukulsky District of the Republic of Dagestan, Russia. As of the 2010 Census, its population was 4,886.

Administrative and municipal status
Within the framework of administrative divisions, the urban-type settlement of Shamilkala is incorporated within Untsukulsky District as Shamilkala Settlement (an administrative division of the district). As a municipal division, Shamilkala Settlement is incorporated within Untsukulsky Municipal District as Shamilkala Urban Settlement.

References

Notes

Sources

Urban-type settlements in the Republic of Dagestan
